Anomalocaris ("unlike other shrimp", or "abnormal shrimp") is an extinct genus of radiodont, an order of early-diverging stem-group arthropods. The first fossils of Anomalocaris were discovered in the Ogygopsis Shale of the Stephen Formation in British Columbia, Canada by Joseph Frederick Whiteaves, with more examples found by Charles Doolittle Walcott in the Burgess Shale unit of the Stephen Formation. Other closely related fossils have been found in the older Emu Bay Shale of Australia, as well as possibly elsewhere. Originally several fossilized parts discovered separately (the mouth, frontal appendages and trunk) were thought to be three separate creatures, a misapprehension corrected by Harry B. Whittington and Derek Briggs in a 1985 journal article. With a body length close to 40 centimetres, A. canadensis is thought to be one of the earliest examples of an apex predator, though others have been found in older Cambrian lagerstätten deposits.

Discovery

Anomalocaris has been misidentified several times, in part due to its makeup of a mixture of mineralized and unmineralized body parts; the mouth and frontal appendage was considerably harder and more easily fossilized than the delicate body. Anomalocaris fossils were first collected in 1886 or 1888 by Richard G. McConnell of the Geological Survey of Canada. The specimens were described and named in 1892 by GSC paleontologist Joseph Frederick Whiteaves. The specimens are now known to represent isolated frontal appendages, but Whiteaves interpreted them as the abdomens of phyllocarid crustaceans. Noting its unusual anatomy for the abdomen of a crustacean, Whiteaves gave it the name Anomalocaris, meaning "unlike other shrimps". In 1928, Danish paleontologist Kai Henriksen proposed that Tuzoia, a Burgess Shale arthropod which was known only from the carapace, represented the missing front half of Anomalocaris. The artists Elie Cheverlange and Charles R. Knight followed this interpretation in their depictions of Anomalocaris.

Unbeknownst to scientists at the time, the body parts of relatives of Anomalocaris had already been described but not recognized as such. The first fossilized mouth of such kind of animal was discovered by Charles Doolittle Walcott, who mistook it for a jellyfish and placed it in the genus Peytoia. Walcott also discovered a frontal appendage but failed to realize the similarities to Whiteaves' discovery and instead identified it as feeding appendage or tail of the coexisted Sidneyia. In the same publication in which he named Peytoia, Walcott named Laggania, a taxon that he interpreted as a holothurian.

In 1966, the Geological Survey of Canada began a comprehensive revision of the Burgess Shale fossil record, led by Cambridge University paleontologist Harry B. Whittington. In the process of this revision, Whittington and his students Simon Conway Morris and Derek Briggs would discover the true nature of Anomalocaris and its relatives, but not without contributing to the history of misinterpretations first. In 1978, Conway Morris recognized that the mouthparts of Laggania were identical to Peytoia, but concluded that Laggania was a composite fossil made up of Peytoia and the sponge Corralio undulata. In 1979, Briggs recognized that the fossils of Anomalocaris were appendages, not abdomens, and proposed that they were the walking legs of a giant arthropod, and that the feeding appendage Walcott had assigned to Sidneyia was the feeding appendage of similar animal, referred to as "appendage F". Later, while clearing what he thought was an unrelated specimen, Harry B. Whittington removed a layer of covering stone to discover the unequivocally connected frontal appendage identical to Anomalocaris and mouthpart similar to Peytoia. Whittington linked the two species, but it took several more years for researchers to realize that the continuously juxtaposed Peytoia, Laggania and frontal appendages (Anomalocaris and "appendage F") actually represented a single group of enormous creatures. The two genera have now been placed into the order Radiodonta and are commonly known as radiodonts or anomalocaridids. Since Peytoia was named first, it is the accepted correct name for the entire animal. However, the original frontal appendage was from a larger species distinct from Peytoia and "Laggania" and therefore retains the name Anomalocaris.

In 2011 and 2020, compound eyes of Anomalocaris were recovered from a paleontological dig at Emu Bay on Kangaroo Island, Australia, proving that Anomalocaris was indeed an arthropod as had been suspected. The find also indicated that advanced arthropod eyes had evolved very early, before the evolution of jointed legs or hardened exoskeletons.

In 2021, "A." saron and "A." magnabasis were reassigned to the new genus Houcaris, in the family Tamisiocarididae. In the same year, "A." pennsylvanica was reassigned to the genus Lenisicaris. In 2022, specimen ELRC 20001 that was treated as unnamed species of Anomalocaris or whole-body specimen of A. saron got new genus, Innovatiocaris. Multiple phylogenetic analysis also suggest "A". briggsi (tamisiocaridid) and "A". kunmingensis (amplectobeluid) are not species of Anomalocaris as well, and wait to be renamed as the formal species had been done.

Stephen Jay Gould cites Anomalocaris as one of the fossilized extinct species he believed to be evidence of a much more diverse set of phyla that existed in the Cambrian Period, discussed in his book Wonderful Life, a conclusion disputed by other paleontologists.

Anatomy

It propelled itself through the water by undulating the flexible flaps on the sides of its body. Each flap sloped below the one more posterior to it, and this overlapping allowed the lobes on each side of the body to act as a single "fin", maximizing the swimming efficiency. The construction of a remote-controlled model showed this mode of swimming to be intrinsically stable, implying that Anomalocaris would not have needed a complex brain to manage balance while swimming. The body was widest between the third and fifth lobe and narrowed towards the tail, with additional 3 pairs of small flaps on the constricted neck region. It is difficult to distinguish lobes near the tail, making an accurate count difficult. For the main trunk flaps, the type species A. canadensis had 13 pairs.

Anomalocaris had an unusual disk-like mouth known as oral cone. The oral cone was composed of several plates organized triradially. Three of the plates were quite large. Three to four medium sized plates could be found between each of the large plates, and several small plates between them. Most of the plates wrinkled and possess scale-like tubercles near the mouth opening. Such an oral cone is very different from those of a typical hurdiid radiodont like Peytoia and Hurdia, which is smooth and tetraradial. Two large frontal appendage were positioned in front of the mouth, at the front of the head. As a shared character across radiodonts, Anomalocaris also possessed three sclerites on the top and side of its head. The top one, known as a head shield, dorsal carapace or H-element, was shaped like an laterally-elongated oval, with a distinct rim on the outer edge. The remaining two lateral sclerites, known as P-elements, were also ovoid, but connected by a bar-like outgrowth. The P-elements were previously misinterpreted as two huge compound eyes.  

The different species had various bodies. Some had a tail furcae and telson, while others had no tail. And some had a naked body while others were covered by plates.

Anomalocaris usually possessed 14 podomeres (segmental units, at least 1 for shaft and 13 for distal articulated region) on each laterally-flattened frontal appendage, almost each one tipped with a pair of endites (ventral spines). The endites themselves were both equipped with multiple auxiliary spines, which branches off from the anterior and posterior margin of the endites. The tail was a large tail fan, composed of three pairs of large, lateral fin-shaped lobes and one terminal lobe-like tailpiece. Previous studies suggest the tail fan was used to propel it through Cambrian waters, while further hydrodynamic study rather suggest it was more adapted to provide steering function. The gills of the animal, in the form of long, thin, hair-like structures known as lanceolate blades, were arranged in rows forming setal blades. The setal blades were attached by their margin to the top side of the animal, two setal blades per body segment. A divide ran down the middle, separating the gills.
Based on fossilized eyes from the Emu Bay Shale, which belonged to an unnamed Anomalocaris (A. cf. canadensis) from the same stratus (previously thought to be those of "A". briggsi, a species which is unlikely an Anomalocaris), the eyes of Anomalocaris were 30 times more powerful than those of trilobites, long thought to have had the most advanced eyes of any contemporary species. With 16,000 lenses, the resolution of the  eyes would have been rivalled only by that of the modern dragonfly, which has 28,000 lenses in each eye. Additionally, estimation of ecdysozoan opsins suggest that Anomalocaris may have had dichromatic Color vision.

Paleobiology

Diet

The interpretation of Anomalocaris as an active predator is widely accepted throughout the history of research, as its raptorial frontal appendages and mid-gut glands strongly suggest a predatory lifestyle. In the case of A. canadensis, its outstanding size amongst Burgess Shale fauna also making it one of the first apex predators known to exist.

However, the long-standing idea that Anomalocaris fed on hard-bodied animals, especially its ability to penetrate mineralized exoskeleton of trilobites, has been questioned. Some Cambrian trilobites have been found with round or W-shaped "bite" marks, which were identified as being the same shape as the mouthparts of Peytoia (previously misidentified as those of Anomalocaris). Stronger evidence that Anomalocaris ate trilobites comes from coprolite, which contain trilobite parts and are so large that the anomalocarids are the only known organism from that period large enough to have produced them. However, since Anomalocaris lacks any mineralized tissue, it seemed unlikely that it would be able to penetrate the hard, calcified shell of trilobites. Rather, the coprolites may have been produced by a different organisms, such as the trilobites of the genus Redlichia. Another suggested possibility is that Anomalocaris fed by grabbing one end of their prey in its oral cone while using its frontal appendages to quickly rock the other end of the animal back and forth. This produced stresses that exploited the weaknesses of arthropod cuticles, causing the prey's exoskeleton to rupture and allowing the predator to access its innards. This behaviour was originally thought to have provided an evolutionary pressure for trilobites to roll up, to avoid being flexed until they snapped. They could also have attacked soft trilobites that had just molted.

The lack of wear on radiodont mouthparts suggests they did not come into regular contact with mineralized trilobite shells, and were possibly better suited to feeding on smaller, soft-bodied organisms by suction, since they would have experienced structural failure if they were used against the armour of trilobites. A. canadensis may have been capable of feeding on organisms with hard exoskeletons due to the short, robust spines on its frontal appendages. However, this conclusion is solely based on the comparison with the fragile frontal appendages of suspension feeding radiodonts (e.g. "A". briggsi and Houcaris spp.). As opposed to Peytoia whose oral cone is more rectangular with short protruding spines, the oral cone of A. canadensis has a smaller and more irregular opening, not permitting strong biting motions, and indicating a suction-feeding behavior to suck in softer organisms. Three-dimensional modelling of various radiodont frontal appendages also suggest that A. canadensis is more capable to prey on smaller (2–5 cm in diameter), active, soft-bodied animals (e.g. vetulicolian; free-swimming arthropods; Nectocaris).

Paleoecology

Anomalocaris canadensis lived in the Burgess Shale in relatively great numbers, though comparable fossils have been found elsewhere, suggesting a more expansive range over the Laurentian continent. In the Burgess Shale, Anomalocaris is more common in the older sections, notably the Mount Stephen trilobite beds. However, in the younger sections, such as the Phyllopod bed, Anomalocaris could reach much greater sizes; roughly twice the size of its older, trilobite bed relatives. These rare giant specimens have previously been referred to a separate species, Anomalocaris gigantea; however, the validity of this species has been called into question, and is currently synonymized to A. canadensis.

Other unnamed species of Anomalocaris live in vastly different environments. For example, Anomalocaris cf. canadensis (JS-1880) lived in the Maotianshan Shales, a shallow tropical sea or even being delta in what is now modern China. Anomalocaris cf. canadensis (Emu Bay Shale) lived in a comparable environment; the shallow, tropical waters of Cambrian Australia. The Maotianshan Shale and the Emu Bay Shale are very close in proximity, being separated by a small landmass, far from the Burgess Shale. These two locations also included "Anomalocaris" kunmingensis and "Anomalocaris" briggsi respectively, species that previously attributed but taxonomically unlikely to be a member of Anomalocaris nor even Anomalocarididae.

See also 

 8564 Anomalocaris, an asteroid named after this animal
Radiodonta, extinct arthropod order composed of Anomalocaris and its relatives
Houcaris, Lenisicaris and Innovatiocaris, radiodont genera contain species originally named as Anomalocaris
Aegirocassis, a giant filter-feeding radiodont from Ordovician Morocco
Cambrian explosion, the large bio-diversification event that occurred during the Cambrian 
Opabinia, a genus of bizarre stem-group arthropod distantly related to the radiodonts
Wiwaxia, a genus of possible mollusk that possessed copious amounts of carbonaceous scales, and lived alongside Anomalocaris

Footnotes

External links 

 
 Anomalocaris 'homepage' with swimming animation
 Burgess Shale: Anomalocaris canadensis (proto-arthropod), Smithsonian.

Cambrian arthropods
Burgess Shale fossils
Maotianshan shales fossils
Anomalocaridids
Fossil taxa described in 1892
Taxa named by Joseph Frederick Whiteaves
Cambrian genus extinctions
Wheeler Shale
Emu Bay Shale
Paleozoic life of the Northwest Territories
Apex predators